Bob and Mike Bryan were the defending champions, but none competed this year as both were playing for Stanford University during this season.

Fernando González and Nicolás Massú won the title by defeating Jean-René Lisnard and Michaël Llodra 6–4, 6–4 in the final. It was the 1st Grand Slam title for González, and the 2nd Grand Slam title for Massú, in their respective doubles careers.

Seeds
The top seed received a bye into the second round.

Draw

Finals

Top half

Bottom half

References
 Official Results Archive (ITF)

Boys' Doubles
US Open, 1997 Boys' Doubles